Schmadel is a German surname of:

 Lutz D. Schmadel, German astronomer
  (born 1938), German politician

See also
 2234 Schmadel (1977 HD), a main-belt asteroid discovered on 1977 by Hans-Emil Schuster

German-language surnames